M. grandis may refer to:
 Meconopsis grandis, the blue Poppy, a flowering plant found in Bhutan
 Melanella grandis, a very small ectparasitic sea snail species in the genus Melanella
 Melanodexia grandis, a fly species in the genus Melanodexia
 Menegazzia grandis, a lichen species found in Australia
 Mexitlia grandis, a spider species in the genus Mexitlia found in Mexico
 Millettia grandis, a legume species found in South Africa
 Miohippus grandis, a prehistoric horse species found in now North America that lived from the late Eocene to early Miocene 
 Moneta grandis, a spider species in the genus Moneta endemic to India
 Mullerornis grandis, an extinct elephant bird species found in Madagascar

Synonyms
 Makalata grandis, a synonym for Toromys grandis, the giant tree rat or white-faced tree rat, a spiny rat species found in Brazil

See also
 Grandis (disambiguation)